Viky Núñez Fuentes (born 14 October 1988) is a Colombian former professional tennis player.

She has career-high WTA rankings of 496 in singles and 415 in doubles. In her career, Núñez won two singles and eight doubles titles on the ITF Circuit.

She made her WTA Tour main-draw debut at the 2007 Copa Colsanitas where she received a wildcard; she then too was awarded wildcards for the 2008 and the 2009 Copa Colsanitas.

Núñez made her WTA Tour doubles main-draw debut also at the 2007 Copa Colsanitas, partnering Mariana Duque.

Playing for the Colombia Fed Cup team, she accumulated a win–loss record of 10–4.

Núñez retired from professional tennis in 2016. Her last match on the circuit was in July 2011.

ITF Circuit finals

Singles: 5 (2 titles, 3 runner-ups)

Doubles: 10 (8 titles, 2 runner-ups)

External links
 
 
 

1988 births
Living people
Colombian female tennis players
Sportspeople from Bogotá
Tennis players at the 2007 Pan American Games
Pan American Games competitors for Colombia
20th-century Colombian women
21st-century Colombian women